Samuel Martin (1694 in Greencastle Estate – 1776) was a prominent planter in Antigua.

Samuel Martin was born on the Greencastle Estate, Antigua, the son of Major Samuel Martin, who, in 1701, was murdered during a slave revolt after having demanded the enslaved Africans on his estate work on Christmas Day. The seven year old Samuel escaped a similar fate, being hidden in nearby fields by his nanny. She was herself enslaved and was subsequently freed in recognition of this act. Samuel was sent to live in Ireland while his mother remarried Edward Byam.

He wrote Essay upon Plantership (1754), a treatise on managing a sugar plantation.

Martin fathered 21 children, at least sixteen of whom died during his lifetime.  The eldest of his sons, Samuel, became a British member of parliament and secretary to the Treasury; Henry became comptroller of the Navy, a member of parliament, and a baronet; Josiah was governor of North Carolina.

References

External links

1694 births
1776 deaths
British Antigua and Barbuda people
Planters from the British West Indies